Philip Rhinelander may refer to:

 Philip H. Rhinelander (1908–1987), philosopher at Stanford University
 Philip M. Rhinelander (1869–1939), bishop of the Episcopal Diocese of Pennsylvania